Elaphrus weissi is a species of ground beetle in the subfamily Elaphrinae. It was described by Dosal in 1996.

References

Elaphrinae
Beetles described in 1996